The Virreina Palace is a building in the city of Barcelona. Situated on the famous La Rambla avenue, today it houses the headquarters of the city council's Culture Institute (Institut de Cultura de l'Ajuntament de Barcelona) and hosts various temporary art exhibitions and cultural events.

The palace was built, between 1772 and 1778, for Manuel d'Amat i de Junyent, who was Viceroy of Peru between 1761 and 1776. It is named for his wife, virreina meaning vicereine in the Catalan language. The architect was Carles Grau, and the palace was built in a style between baroque and rococo. Grau, also a sculptor, created the window hoods and the vases which decorate the building's skyline.

On the exterior of the palace is a statue of Our Lady of the Rosary, created by Luisa Granero in 1967.

Gallery

References

External links 
—Official Palau de la Virreina (Virreina Palace) website

-

Museums in Barcelona
Art museums and galleries in Catalonia
Ciutat Vella
La Rambla, Barcelona
Houses completed in 1778

Palaces in Barcelona